Richard Eddy, D.D. (21 June 1828 – 16 August 1906) was an American Universalist clergyman, born at Providence, R. I.  He was a chaplain of the Sixtieth New York Volunteers during the American Civil War.  From 1877 to 1906 he was president of the Universalist Historical Society and from 1886 to 1891 he was editor of the Universalist Register.

Biography
Richard Eddy was born in Providence, Rhode Island, June 21, 1828. He was the son of Richard Eddy and wife Martha James. He descended from the immigrant Zachariah Eddy. He was reared in the public schools of Providence. His parents were connected with the interests of the First Universalist Church.

He learned the book binders trade when a young man. He loved books because they were books, as well as for their content. A trade no sooner learned than his mind turned towards the Christian ministry. In 1848, when twenty years old, he began the study, or the reading of theology with the Rev. Thomas J. Sawyer at Clinton Liberal Institute, Clinton, New York. This School of Theology was established in 1845. He rapidly acquired the rudiments of an education, and as was the custom of the day, soon gained opportunities for preaching. He remained at Clinton two years, and though not a college trained man, yet with a ready wit, be learned the essentials of classic and sacred literature. His all-round common sense and practical fashion of studying literature and human nature, early developed within him the characteristics which made him the strong man that he was. He was ordained to the Christian ministry in Frankfort, N. Y., in 1850. These months with the Rev. Dr. Sawyer, cemented a friendship which was life-long. They possessed many of the same characteristics and each grew to admire the other. On the death of the Sawyer, his family at once turned to Eddy, to become the biographer of his old time instructor. Their continued intimacy amply qualified him for the task, and the biography of the lives of Dr. and Mrs. Caroline A. Sawyer, became a model of its kind.

The pastorates of Eddy were at Rome, Buffalo, ad Canton, New York, where he was during the Civil War; Philadelphia, where for a time he was Librarian of the Pennsylvania Historical Society; Franklin, Massachusetts, and Gloucester, Massachusetts where, as pastor of the church which welcomed in 1870 the Centennial Convention, he received high regard as an organizer and executive; Akron, Ohio, and Melrose, Massachusetts. He supplied in late years for longer or shorter periods, but wherever he was, he was more than an ordinary "supply". Through his pastoral services, he proved himself a pastor for the aged and youthful alike, and ever the cordial and warm friend to those desiring education. His last residence as pastor was at Chatham, Massachusetts, where he continued until health failed him.

Eddy was a vigorous writer, and could deliver his sermons with earnestness and unction. His note book gave the following statistics: sermons preached, 6,786; lectures, 2,400; funerals, 2,362; and weddings, 375.

Eddy during the Civil War served the 60th N. Y. Volunteer Infantry as Chaplain for nineteen months. He was a faithful Chaplain and rendered that service which gained for him a permanent hold upon the soldiers during the war, and in the ranks of the veterans in the years since. He wrote a history of the Regiment soon after the war.

Eddy was a reformer of the far seeing school. From young manhood, he was a promoter of the temperance cause. During a series of years, he was at the head of the order of Good Templars in Massachusetts. Two volumes he prepared and were published by the American Temperance Society, entitled Alcohol in History, and Alcohol in Society. In these books were shown learning and skill of treatment, which easily placed them in the front ranks of temperance literature.

Eddy ever exercised and manifested the instinct of the historian for the blessing of mankind. He read history that he might the better be able to help forward a struggling and striving world. He wrote Universalism in America,” in two volumes. To be the author of this book is sufficient fame. This history is a text book of the Universalist Church, showing its beginning and growth in the midst of much opposition. No clergy man or layman can afford to neglect this source of information. It is a volume never to be outgrown nor discarded. Dr. Eddy contributed the volume upon “Universalism” in Volume X American Church History,and was a writer of articles upon the Church in several encyclopedias. Eddy in 1887 became the editor of The Universalist Register, and for nineteen years, gave it care and patience in the research for information and intelligence in placing the information before the Universalist constituency. The Register was no easy book to edit, but Eddy rendered a fine service for the Church in giving it a faithful and patient skill scarcely equalled.

Eddy became editor of The Universalist Quarterly in October 1886, though it was in January 1885 that he became the assistant of the Rev. Dr. T. B. Thayer. From this time until its discontinuance in 1891, his contributions, editorials and book reviews were of a superior order, and made this storehouse of literature equal to any theological review of the period. He indeed was a worthy successor of Doctors Hosea Ballou 2nd, George H. Emerson and Thomas B. Thayer. Before Eddy became editor of The Universalist Quarterly, his contributions were not few nor unworthy. In 1874, he began a series of eleven articles upon "The Universalist Convention and Its Creeds,” a series which should be put into book, or more accessible form. These articles traced the growth and changes of denominational government, and statements, and their strict adherence to the essential and distinctive doctrines. These articles were not made use of in his "History of Universalism" but were entirely distinct, though they run harmoniously side by side. The genius of the Universalist Church was finely witnessed in this series of articles Eddy as an interpreter of the on-moving discussions and conduct, not only of the Universalist Church but of the various schools in theology in our nation had few rivals. His contributions upon “Judith Murray," and the “Universalist Origin of the American Sunday School,” were significant.

Eddy served organized Universalism. He was often secretary of conventions, or president of them ; or a man on a committee who possessed initiative and was ready with suggestion and tack. He was “Standing Clerk" of what is now the General Convention, from 1861 to 1867, during which time he was active for a more perfect unity of Universalist believers into the General Convention which was brought about in 1866. This service in behalf of the General Convention and his ample knowledge of Universalist history qualified him to be pastor at Gloucester when the Convention met there in 1870, and observed the centennial of the coming of John Murray to the American shore. Eddy served as President of the Universalist Historical Society since 1878. Tufts College conferred upon him in 1883 the degree of S. T. D.

Personal life
Eddy married in 1852 Miss Sarah Stoddard of Hudson, New York, who was the mother of his five children. He married second, Mrs. Lucy P. Friend of Gloucester, who was left his widow. His last days were spent in Gloucester where he suddenly died August 16, 1906. His funeral services were held on the following Sunday from the Independent, or First Universalist Church.

Selected works
 History of Universalism in America, 1636-1886 (1884–86)  
 Alcohol in History (1887)  
 Universalism in Gloucester, Mass. (1892)  
 History of Universalism, 120-1890, A. D. (1894)  
 Life of Thomas J. Sawyer, D. D., and Caroline M. Sawyer (1900)

References

External links
 The scrapbooks and autobiography of Richard Eddy is in the Harvard Divinity School Library at Harvard Divinity School in Cambridge, Massachusetts.

Union Army chaplains
19th-century American historians
19th-century American male writers
1828 births
1906 deaths
Clergy of the Universalist Church of America
American Christian theologians
19th-century Christian universalists
20th-century Christian universalists
19th-century American clergy
American male non-fiction writers